Sándor Wekerle the Younger (26 June 1878 – 23 December 1963) was a Hungarian politician, who served as Minister of Finance between 1928 and 1931. His father was Sándor Wekerle, who was the Prime Minister of Hungary at three times during the Austro-Hungarian Monarchy. Wekerle Jr. studied on the University of Budapest and other several universities in Europe. He was member of the House of Representatives between 1906 and 1910. He fought in the First World War. After the war he taught for the Academy of Trade again. In 1927 he became a member of the House of Magnates.

During his ministership he tried, without significant result, to fight against the effects of the Great Depression. In the late period of the Regency he published many works about the law and finance.

References
 Magyar Életrajzi Lexikon

1878 births
1963 deaths
Politicians from Budapest
People from the Kingdom of Hungary
National Constitution Party politicians
Finance ministers of Hungary
Children of prime ministers of Hungary